Baroness Taylor may refer to:
 Ann Taylor, Baroness Taylor of Bolton (born 1947), Labour Party politician and Cabinet minister
 Sharon Taylor, Baroness Taylor of Stevenage (born 1956), Labour Party politician and county councillor

See also 
 Lord Taylor (disambiguation)